This page lists board and card games, wargames, and miniatures games published in 1973.  For video games, see 1973 in video gaming.

Games released or invented in 1973

Significant games-related events of 1973
Game Designers' Workshop founded.
TSR, Inc. founded.  TSR will later release Dungeons & Dragons, the first role-playing game.

See also
 1973 in video gaming

References

Games
Games by year